These are the Billboard magazine Hot Dance Airplay number one hits of 2006.

Note that Billboard publishes charts with an issue date approximately 7–10 days in advance.

References

United States Dance Airplay
2006